Mazafaka may refer to:

 Mazafaka (hacker group), a hacker group on the dark web
 Motherfucker